Amherst Street is a north–south street in Central Kolkata in the Indian state of West Bengal. The street was named after William Amherst, 1st Earl Amherst. It has been renamed as Raja Rammohan Roy Sarani after Raja Rammohan Roy, one of the most famous social-reformers of India. The road starts from Vivekananda Road crossing (Chaltabagan, Maniktala) and extends up to Bepin Behari Ganguly Street crossing (Lebutala, Bowbazar) via MG Road crossing and Surya Sen Street crossing. On the extreme north lies Raja Rammohan Roy Memorial Museum and on the extreme south lies the Bank of India (Bowbazar).

Geography

Police district
Amherst Street police station is part of the North and North Suburban division of Kolkata Police. It is located at 57, Raja Rammohan Sarani, Kolkata-700009.

Amherst Street Women police station, located at the same address as above covers all police districts under the jurisdiction of the North and North Suburban division i.e. Amherst Street, Jorabagan, Shyampukur, Cossipore, Chitpur, Sinthi, Burtolla and Tala.

Places of interest

Colleges
 St. Paul's Cathedral Mission College (estd. 1864)
 City College, Kolkata (estd. 1881), Anandamohan College (estd. 1961), Rammohan College (estd. 1961)

School
 St.Paul's School (estd. 1822) https://goo.gl/maps/pTiWAyxsm7N6jvvz7

Landmarks
The popular and famous landmarks are Union Bank of India (Maniktala), Raja Rammohan Roy Memorial Museum, Lawrence Day School, Bose's Clinical Laboratory, Shree Vishudhanand Saraswati Marwari Hospital (Popularly known as Marwari Hospital), Holy Trinity Church (Kolkata), Amherst Street Post Office (Now Raja Rammohan Sarani Post Office), Shraddhananda Park, Lady Dufferin Hospital and Union Bank of India (Bowbazar). St.Paul's School ( 33/1, Amherst Street),head office of British Institute, 35 Raja Rammohon roy sarani

Festivals
Some of the notable festivals that take place in and around the street include Chaltabagan Lohapatty Durga Puja, Somendra Nath Mitra's Kali Puja (Amherst Street Sarbojonin) and Jhamapukur Sarbojonin (Subal Chandra Lane) Tamoghna Ghosh's Kali Puja and Fatakesto's Kali Puja.

In popular culture
Born Into Brothels, a 2004 documentary film directed by Zana Briski mentions this street in the movie.

Gallery

References

External links

Streets in Kolkata